Ozone is a molecule consisting of three oxygen atoms.

Ozone may also refer to:

Fictional characters
 Ozone (G.I. Joe), a fictional character in the G.I. Joe universe
 Ozone, a character played by Shabba Doo in the movies Breakin' and Breakin' 2: Electric Boogaloo

Media
 Ozone (magazine), a magazine
 Ozone (film), a horror movie produced by Full Moon Features

People
 Makoto Ozone (born 1961), a Japanese jazz pianist
 Ozone, one of many stage names of Jezper Söderlund, Swedish DJ

Places

United States
 Ozone, Arkansas, an unincorporated community in the U.S.
 Ozone, Tennessee, an unincorporated community in the U.S.
 Ozone Park, Queens, a New York City neighborhood

Elsewhere
 Ōzone (大曽根), Japan, a district in Nagoya, central Japan

Other uses
 Ozone, a 3D plugin component of E-on Vue scenery generator software
 Ozone, a series of audio mastering plugins made by iZotope (Ozone 7, 8, 9, 10)
 Ozone (group), an early 1980s funk/soul group signed to Motown records
 Ozone (paddle steamer), an early Australian paddle steamer
 Ozone F.C., an Indian association football team
 Ozone Gliders, a French aircraft manufacturer

See also
 O-Zone (disambiguation)
 Ozone cracking, a form of degradation in elastomers
 Ozone layer, a region of Earth's stratosphere that absorbs most of the Sun's ultraviolet radiation
 Ozone House, a non-profit youth shelter in Ann Arbor, Michigan, US
 Ozone Theatres, a former cinema chain in South Australia